Pike Township is one of the nine townships of Marion County, Indiana, United States, North America, located in the northwestern portion of the county. The entire township is administratively part of Indianapolis, although a portion of the included town of Clermont lies in the southwest corner. As of the 2010 census, Pike Township had a population of 77,895 living in an area of approximately 107 km² (41.5 mi²). Pike Township was named for Zebulon Pike.

The Metropolitan School District of Pike Township nearly covers the township, but a small area in the south is within the Indianapolis Public Schools system. The private Brebeuf Jesuit Preparatory School is also in this township.

Pike Township is home to Eagle Creek Park and Lafayette Square Mall. The National FFA Organization, Kiwanis International, Dow AgroSciences, Klipsch Audio Technologies, Cheever Racing, and the Indianapolis Colts have their headquarters there. The north junction of I-65 and I-465 is located in this township and while I-74 runs through the southwest corner, there are no exits available from I-74.

Geography

Municipalities 
 Clermont (northern half)
 Indianapolis (partial)

References

External links
 Pike Township Historical Society
 Historic Traders Point
 Indiana Township Association
 United Township Association of Indiana

Townships in Marion County, Indiana
Geography of Indianapolis
Townships in Indiana